The Imran Khan ministry was the government of Pakistan which was formed by Imran Khan following his successful election as Prime Minister of Pakistan by the National Assembly. The Cabinet had 25 Federal Ministers, 4 Ministers of state and 4 Advisors, most of whom assumed office on 20 August 2018.

The Cabinet dissolved on 3 April 2022 following the dissolution of the National Assembly of Pakistan. On 7 April 2022, the Supreme Court of Pakistan ordered the restoration of the Federal Cabinet.

The Cabinet dissolved on 10 April 2022 following the defeat of Imran Khan during the Vote of No-confidence. He was the first ever Prime Minister of Pakistan to be ousted from office using the Vote of No-Confidence.

Cabinet

Khan announced his cabinet soon after taking the oath, he kept the ministry of interior to himself. His choice for ministries was criticized as he came into power on the slogan of Change and Naya Pakistan but most of his appointees were previously ministers during the era of Pervez Musharraf and some served in PPP government which followed Musharraf era.

He was criticized by supporters and critics for settling for "Diet Reform" as Musharraf pursued rather than the real change that was embodied by the PTI. Some supporters defended Khan since the PTI was in a coalition government and needed "electables" to win the election.

To counter that, Imran Khan hold meeting with the federal cabinet twice a week and monitor the ministers’ performances regularly. Khan's Ministry is known to have most number of meetings in history.

Prime Minister Imran Khan convened 46 meetings of the Federal Cabinet compared to his first year in office when he chaired 52 meetings of the Federal Cabinet. Rule 20 of Government of Pakistan Rules of Business calls for a weekly cabinet meeting which translates into about 52 meetings per year.

As a result, Khusro Bakhtiar was shuffled 5 times although he had served as a minister during Musharraf's regime and PML-N coalition government

Shafqat Mehmood was assigned two portfolio and he was commended for his perofrmance during COVID. He had also served as a minister during 1990s and Musharraf regime.

Farogh Naseem has been part of Musharraf's legal team representing him against treason charges which aroused speculation on PTI's stance on if Pervez Musharraf will be tried for treason. Tariq Bashir Cheema has been minister in a past PPP government.

Fehmida Mirza has been Speaker of the National Assembly of Pakistan in a PPP government.

Sheikh Rasheed Ahmad was assigned the railways and interior ministry on the basis of his experience as a minister during the Musharraf and PML-N era.

Ghulam Sarwar Khan also served as a minister during Musharraf regime. Zubaida Jalal Khan was a minister and held the same portfolio during Musharraf era.

Fawad Chaudhry was media coordinator in the political party formed by Musharraf as well a special Assistant to Prime Minister Yousuf Raza Gilani.

Shah Mehmood Qureshi held the same portfolio in a PPP government. Babar Awan also served in a past PPP government.

Malik Amin Aslam held same portfolio under Musharraf government but is more of a technocrat than a politician. Abdul Razak Dawood was commerce minister for Musharraf as well.

Omar Ayub Khan was the minister of state for finance in Shaukat Aziz's cabinet during the Pervez Musharraf regime. Ali Muhammad Mahar was the former Chief Minister of Sindh during the Musharraf regime. Firdous Ashiq Awan, also served as Federal Minister of Information in PPP government.

Reshuffles 
Imran Khan reshuffled his cabinet for around six time during his ministry. One of the cabinet reshuffle was on the directions of a court that barred un-elected advisers and special assistants from heading the Cabinet committees.

On 18 April 2019, the cabinet saw a reshuffle after Asad Umar stepped down as the finance minister.

On 6 April 2020, the cabinet saw another reshuffle. In late April 2020, PTI Senator Shibli Faraz was appointed as the information minister. Meanwhile, retired Lt Gen Asim Saleem Bajwa was appointed as special assistant to the prime minister for information replacing Firdous Ashiq Awan.

In December 2020, the federal cabinet saw the fourth reshuffle days after the Islamabad High Court ruled that unelected advisers and special assistants could not head government’s committees.

In April 2021, Shaukat Tarin was appointed as finance minister, the fourth person to hold the post in the last two years, as Prime Minister Imran Khan made his sixth cabinet reshuffle since assuming power.

Federal Ministers

Minister of State

Advisors

Special Assistants to the Prime Minister

See also
 Prime Ministership of Imran Khan

References

 
Pakistani federal ministries
Cabinets established in 2018
Cabinets disestablished in 2022
2018 establishments in Pakistan
2022 disestablishments in Pakistan